The 2019–20 Denmark Series was the 55th season of the Denmark Series, the fourth-tier of the Danish football league structure organised by the Danish FA (DBU). The league was divided in four pools of ten teams each. Initially, the winner of each pool was to be promoted to the 2020-21 Danish 2nd Division, while the last place team would be relegated to a lower division and bottom two teams of each pool in danger of playing relegation-playoff (depending on Danish 2nd Division results).

Due to the COVID-19 pandemic, the season was suspended after 14 games and relegation was cancelled. The top two teams in each group faced two promotion play-off matches. However, if the winner of the group won the first play off match, they would get the promotion.

Participants

Group 1

League table

Promotion play-off

|}
Source: Danish FA

Group 2

League table

Promotion play-off

|}
Source: Danish FA

Group 3

League table

Promotion play-off

|}
Source: Danish FA

Group 4

League table

Promotion play-off

|}
6–6 on aggregate. Holstebro Boldklub won, because they finished as no. 1 in the league.

Source: Danish FA

References

4
Denmark Series
Denmark Series seasons